Hazelton may refer to:

Places

Canada 
 Hazelton, British Columbia
 Hazelton Mountains, British Columbia

United States 
 Hazelton, Idaho
 Hazelton, Kansas
 Hazelton, New Jersey
 Hazelton, North Dakota
 Hazelton (Youngstown, Ohio)
 Hazelton, West Virginia
 United States Penitentiary, Hazelton, a federal prison in West Virginia

Other uses 
 Hazelton (sternwheeler), a British Columbian vessel
 Hazelton Airlines, a former regional airline in Australia

People with the given name 
 Hazelton Nicholl (1882–1956), British military officer
 Hazelton Spencer (1757–1813), Canadian soldier, political figure, and judge

People with the surname 
 Charlie Hazelton (1917–1985), Australian rugby league footballer
 Donald F. Hazelton (died 2012), American politician from Florida
 Edwin Hazelton (1861–1916), English cricketer
 George Cochrane Hazelton (1832–1922), American politician from Wisconsin
 Gerry Whiting Hazelton (1829–1920), American politician from Wisconsin
 Jim Hazelton (1931–2014), Australian aviator, co-founder of Hazelton Airlines
 John W. Hazelton (1814–1878), American politician from New Jersey
 Joseph Hazelton (1853–1936), American actor
 Marc Hazelton (born 1980), English cricketer
 Mary Brewster Hazelton (1868–1953), American painter
 Max Hazelton (born 1927), Australian aviator, co-founder of Hazelton Airlines
 Porter Hazelton (1812–1870), American politician from Michigan 
 Rebecca Hazelton (born 1978), American poet, editor, and critic
 Ron Hazelton (born 1942), American television host
 Scottie Hazelton (born 1973), American football coach
 Terra Hazelton, Canadian musician, broadcaster, and actress
 Vidal Hazelton (born 1988), American football player
 Wyndham Hazelton (1894–1958), English cricketer

See also
 Hazelton Township (disambiguation)
 New Hazelton
 Hazleton (disambiguation)
 Haselton, a surname